Fiach is an Irish male given name. It may refer to:
 Saint Fiacc, fifth-century bishop of Sletty in Ireland
 Fiach McHugh O'Byrne (1534–1597) Irish chief 
 Fiach Mac Conghail (born 1964) Irish theatre director and Senator
 Fiach Moriarty, Irish singer-songwriter

See also
 Tomás Ó Fiaich, Irish Catholic primate and cardinal

Similar names
 Fiacha
 Fiachra
 Fiachna

Irish-language masculine given names